Stewart Lake National Wildlife Refuge is a  National Wildlife Refuge (NWR) in the U.S. state of North Dakota. Almost  of Stewart Lake NWR is an easement refuge and is on privately owned land, but the landowners and U.S. Government work cooperatively to protect the resources. The remaining acreage is on public lands. The U.S. Fish and Wildlife Service oversees Stewart Lake NWR from their offices at Audubon National Wildlife Refuge.

References

External links
 Oh Ranger: Stewart Lake National Wildlife Refuge

Protected areas of Slope County, North Dakota
National Wildlife Refuges in North Dakota
Easement refuges in North Dakota